AEK Handball Club is the handball department of the major Greek multi-sports club A.E.K. It was established in 2005. The club is commonly known in European competitions as AEK Athens HC.

History
The department Handball of A.E.K. founded by a decision of the General Assembly of A.E.K. on 12 July 2005.

On 5 August 2005, the Greek Handball Federation accepted a merger through absorption of the association's Board of handball GA Ilioupolis with AEK Handball Club.

During the period 2006–07, AEK Handball Club acquired the 3rd position in A1 (Greek Men's handball championship) and gained the participation at European Cups for the first time.

During the period 2007–08, AEK participated at EHF Cup (European Handball Federation Cup) and eliminated by Dinamo Baumit Bucuresti at second round.

On 31 May 2009, with Nikos Georgantzoglou as a president, AEK won the first Greek handball cup winning Filippos by a score of 33–31 in Serres.

For the period 2009–10 AEK participated at EHF Cup Winners' Cup.

For the third round of EHF Cup Winners' Cup, AEK HC played against BSB Izmir on 14 November 2009 in Athens (losing 24–29) and on 21 November 2009 in Smyrni (draw 22–22).
During the period 2009–10, AEK HC terminated at 4th position of A1, gaining its European participation for 2nd consecutive time and for 3rd in general. 
In addition, AEK HC participated at the final-four of Greek men's handball cup on 29 May 2010 in Lamia, but the semi-final game against PAOK did not take place due to fan "fights".

For the second round of European Challenge Cup (2010–11), AEK HC won HC Dinamo Minsk 31–25 in Athens and lost 32–27 in Minsk and therefore AEK has been advanced to the top 16 teams.
For the third round (phase of 16), AEK defeated Sporting Lisboa at penalties. AEK lost 27–23 in Lisboa, but won 27–23 in Athens and so the game went on penalty-kicks, where AEK advanced 
to the top 8 with final score 32–27. For the Quarter-Final (phase of 8), 
AEK played against Partizan of Beograd and disqualified.

On 7 May 2011, AEK won the Greek handball championship through the play-offs and became champion for the first time in their short history. AEK needed only the win against PAOK at Thessaloniki and was losing by one goal (22–21) 30 seconds before the final whistle but with great will and power scored twice (the final goal at the exact second of the final)
and gained the first championship of its history just 6 years from their establishment. AEK participated to the first round of the EHF Champions League for the period 2011–12 and also to the first round of Challenge Cup, losing from Lions (Holland).

On 17 March 2012, AEK participated to the final game of the Greek men's handball cup against PAOK, but lost the game 26–24. AEK participated to the EHF Cup for the period 2012–13
but was eliminated by Diomidis Argous in the first round, losing both games at Argos and Athens.

On 3 March 2013, AEK won the second Greek handball cup in its history, winning PAOK by a score of 27–23 in Kerkyra (Corfu). The same year on 1 June 2013 AEK won the second Greek handball championship against Diomidis.

On 19 March 2014, AEK won the third Greek handball championship in its history, winning Diomidis 18–16 in Athens.

On 29 March 2015, AEK participated in the final of the Greek men's handball cup for fifth time in a row, against PAOK, but lost the game by a score of 27–29. The team finished third in the Greek handball championship.

On 14 and 20 May 2018, AEK HC played to the final games of EHF Challenge Cup 2017–18 and became one of the three most successful teams in Greek handball
(including Diomidis Argous and Filippos Verias) in European achievements. In 2020, AEK won its third Greek Championship.

On 23 May 2021, AEK HC won the fourth Greek handball cup in its history, winning PAOK by a score of 24–22 in Kozani. On 30 May of the same year, AEK HC won the first EHF European Cup in its history by winning the Swedish club Ystads IF, this way AEK HC became the most successful Greek club in European handball competitions. AEK won its fourth Greek Championship on 6 July 2021 celebrating a historic treble.

Kits

Honours

European competitions

EHF European Cup
  Winners (1): 2020–21
  Runner-up (1): 2017–18

Domestic competitions

Greek Championship
 Winners (4): 2010–11, 2012–13, 2019–20, 2020–21
 Runner-up (5): 2012, 2014, 2018, 2019, 2022
Greek Cup
 Winners (4): 2008–09, 2012–13, 2013–14, 2020–21
 Runner-up (6): 2011, 2012, 2015, 2019, 2020, 2022

Tournaments

Official Tournaments
 47th International Handball Tournament Struga (1): 2019
 1st International Tournament "Andreas Papastamatis" (2): 2020, 2021

Unofficial team awards

 Continental Treble (European trophy, National league, National cup)
 Winners (1): 2020–21
 Double (National league, National cup)
 Winners (2): 2012–13, 2020–21

Players

Squad for the 2022–23 season

Goalkeepers
1  Ivan Matskevich
 12  Theodoros Kalamatas
 32  Igor Arsić

Back players
CB
8  Sokratis Kalyvas
 11  Radojica Čepić
 18  Ignacio Moya Florido
 96  Patrick Andre Toniazzo Lemos

LB
9  Stipe Mandalinić
 10  Panagiotis Nikolaidis (c)
 19  Konstantinos Kotsionis
 34  Ioannis Kalomoiros
 51  Luka Sokolić

RB
5  Nikola Jukić
 15  Efthymios Iliopoulos
 Đorđe Golubović

Wingers
Line players
 13  Leonardo Domenech de Almeida
 22  Anastasios Papadionysiou
 27  Nikolaos Liapis
 93  Łukasz Rogulski

LW
3  Maximilien Tike
 68  Aurélien Tchitombi
 88  Jonathan Azorin
 98  Georgios Vardaxopoulos
 99  Christos Kederis

RW
2  Evangelos Arampatzis
5  Nemanja Živković

Transfers
Transfers for the 2022–23 season

 Joining
  Ivan Matskevich (GK) (from  HC Meshkov Brest)
  Maximilien Tike (LW) (from  JS Cherbourg Manche)
  Stipe Mandalinić (LB) (from  RK Eurofarm Pelister)
  Nikola Jukić (RB) (from  GWD Minden)
  Nemanja Živković (RW) (from  RK Partizan) 
  Łukasz Rogulski (P) (from  KS Azoty-Puławy)
  Nikolaos Liapis (P) (from  CB Ademar León)
   Aurélien Tchitombi (LW) (from  Grand Nancy Métropole)
  Leonardo Domenech de Almeida (P) (from  BM. Logroño La Rioja)
  Radojica Čepić (CB) (from  HSG Wetzlar)
  Đorđe Golubović (RB) (from  HT Tatran Prešov)

 Leaving 
  Goran Andjelic (GK) (to  AC Diomidis Argous)
  Petros Boukovinas (GK) (to  TV Großwallstadt)
  Olexandr Shevelev (P) (to  AC Diomidis Argous)
  Nikola Stevanovic (RB) (to  Alpla HC Hard)
  Ignacio Plaza Jiménez (P) (to  FC Porto)
  Cristian Ugalde (LW) (to  Tatabánya KC)

Team officials
Staff for the 2022–23 season

Season by season

 In 2019–20 season, the Greek Cup final against Diomidis Argous and the EHF Challenge Cup quarterfinal against Potaissa Turda were cancelled due to COVID-19 pandemic.

European competitions record

Notable former coaches
  Giannis Arvanitis
 Dimitris Dimitroulias
  Kostas Toutsis
  Nikos Grammatikos (2017–2019)
  Dimitris Dimitroulias (2019–2022)

Notable current and former players

  Abderrahim Berriah (2021–2022)
  Sofiane Bendjilali (2021–2022)
  Thomas Bauer (2020–2021)
  Nikola Stevanovic (2022)
  Ivan Matskevich (2022–)
  Tomislav Nuić (2021)
  Patrick Andre Toniazzo Lemos (2020–)
  Leonardo Domenech de Almeida (2022–)
  Marin Buneta (2019–2021)
  Stipe Mandalinić (2022–)
  Nikola Jukić (2022–)
  Ioulios Argyrou
  Aurélien Tchitombi (2022–)
  Lars Jacobsen (2018–2020)
  Jesper Meinby (2021)
  Malik Hoggas (2019–2020)
  Maximilien Tike (2022–)
  Christoforos Bakaoukas (2005–2016)
  Savvas Karypidis (2013–2015)
  Fanis Tsaousis (2005–2015)
  Giorgos Papadopoulos
  Dimitris Kaffatos (2005–2007, 2009–2014, 2019–2020)
  Dionysis Georgiadis (2010–2020)
 Giorgos Perros
  Alexandros Alvanos (2012–2014, 2018–2019)
  Spyros Balomenos (2012–2013)
  Panagiotis Nikolaidis
  Konstantinos Tsilimparis (2013–2015)
  Grigoris Sanikis (2013–2015)
  Gergö Rózsavölgyi (2019)
  Laurynas Palevicius (2018–2019)
  Mladen Rakčević (2013–2014)
  Goran Andjelic (2021–2022)
  Radojica Čepić (2023–)
  Joakim Hykkerud (2021)
  Łukasz Rogulski (2022–)
  Bogdan Criciotoiu (2020)
  Radule Radulovic (2017–2019)
  Milan Kosanović (2019–2021)
  Miljan Manić
  Mirko Lukić
  Zlatko Šuša
  Eldin Vražalica
  Igor Arsic (2019–2020)
  Nemanja Živković (2022–)
  Đorđe Golubović (2023–)
  Maros Balaz (2018–2019)
  Juraj Briatka (2021–2022)
  Luis Felipe Jiménez Reina (2020–2021)
  Ignacio Plaza Jiménez (2019–2022)
  Cristian Ugalde (2020–2022)
  Ignacio Moya Florido (2020–)
  Anis Gatfi
  Yunus Özmusul (2019)
  Olexandr Shevelev (2022)

Sponsorships
Great Sponsor: Elliniki Etairia Graniton
Official Sport Clothing Manufacturer: Macron
Official Broadcaster: ERT3

References

External links
Official websites
  
 AEK H.C. at HHF 
 AEK H.C. at EHF 

Media
 Official Facebook page

Handball
Greek handball clubs
2005 establishments in Greece
Handball clubs established in 2005